The following is a list of notable events and releases of the year 2003 in Norwegian music.

Events

January
 17 – The 22nd annual Djangofestival started on Cosmopolite in Oslo, Norway (January 17 – 19).
 30 – The 6th Polarjazz started in Longyearbyen, Svalbard (January 30 – February 2).

February
 6 – Kristiansund Opera Festival opened (February 6 – 22).

March
 13 – The annual By:Larm started in Trondheim (March 13 – 16).

April
 11
 The 30th Vossajazz started at Voss (April 11 – 13).
 Kåre Opheim was awarded Vossajazzprisen 2003.
 3 – Terje Rypdal performs the commissioned work Vossabrygg for Vossajazz 2003.
 25 –  Ole Blues started in Bergen (April 25 – May 3).

May
 6 – The 14th MaiJazz started in Stavanger (May 6 – 10).
 21
The start of Bergen International Music Festival Festspillene i Bergen (May 21 – June 1).
 The 31st Nattjazz 2004 started in Bergen (May 21 – 31).

June
 13 – Norwegian Wood started in Oslo (June 13 – 15).

July
 2 – The 39th Kongsberg Jazzfestival started in Kongsberg (July 2 – 5).
 12 – The 43rd Moldejazz started in Molde (July 12 – 17).

August
 6 – The 17th Sildajazz started in Haugesund (August 6 – 10).
 7 – The annual Øyafestivalen started in Oslo (August 7 – 9).
 11 – The 18th Oslo Jazzfestival started in Oslo (August 11 – 17).

September
 3 – The 2nd Insomnia Festival started in Tromsø (September 3 – 6).
 30 – The 1st Ekkofestival started in Bergen (September 30 – Oktober 3.

October
 1 – The DølaJazz started in Lillehammer.
 2 – The Ultima Oslo Contemporary Music Festival started in Oslo (October 2 – 12).
 31 – The Trondheim Jazz Festival started in Trondheim (October 31 – November 8).

November
 4 – The Oslo World Music Festival started in Oslo (November 4 – 9).

December
  11– The Nobel Peace Prize Concert was held in Oslo Spektrum.

Albums released

November

Unknown date

A
 Arild Andersen
 Moon Water (NorCD), with Carsten Dahl and Patrice Heral

B
 Jon Balke
 Trialogue (Jazzland Recordings), with Lars Møller and Morten Lund

I
 Terje Isungset
 Middle Of Mist (Jazzland Recordings)

N
 Paal Nilssen-Love
 Schlinger (Smalltown Supersound), with Håkon Kornstad

Births

 April
 11 – Aksel Rykkvin, boy soprano.

Deaths

January

June
 5 – Ola Calmeyer, jazz pianist (born 1930).

 November
 6 – Hallvard Johnsen, composer and flautist (born 1916).

December
 12 – Peder Alhaug, tenor (born 1921).

See also
 2003 in Norway
 Music of Norway
 Norway in the Eurovision Song Contest 2003
 2003 in jazz

References

 
Norwegian music
Norwegian
Music
2000s in Norwegian music